Jo Baker may refer to:

 Jo Baker (make-up artist) (born 1980), English make-up artist
 Jo Baker (novelist) (born 1973), British writer
 Jo Baker (singer) (1948–1996), American vocalist and songwriter